The Bolgatanga Technical University BTU, (formally Bolgatanga Polytechnic) is a small public tertiary institution in the Upper East Region of Ghana, West Africa. It is gradually increasing its courses and facilities following the achievement of university status. It was converted into a Technical University during the administration of the former president of Ghana, John Dramani Mahama. The institution was established in 1999 but started rolling out its academic programs in September 2003 as Bolgatanga Polytechnic.

Campuses
 Currently, the university has two campuses, with the main operations at Sumbrungu on the Bolgatanga – Navrongo highway, opened in 2007. Bolgatanga is the capital of the Upper East Region of Ghana and has a population of under 70,000 people. The university began as a School in Bukere, a suburb of Bolgatanga. The pioneer staff worked from there until the Sumbrungu campus was finished. Bukere currently has an Evening School where both tertiary and non-tertiary programs are run.

History, departments and programs

The school was founded in 1999 under PNDC Law 321(1992) which was amended in 2007 with an Act of Parliament (Act 745). It was converted into a Technical University in April, 2020, by the Technical Universities amendment Act 2020 (Act 1016).

Academic programmes began in September 2003 in Bukere. Over the years, the School and then University has grown in terms of infrastructure, staff numbers and their qualifications, academic programmes and student numbers.

The university runs over twenty-five different tertiary programmes at BTech, HND and Diploma level in three Schools; 
School of Business and Management Studies 
School of Applied Science and Arts 
School of Engineering.

Ecological Agriculture is the niche area of the university, situated in a dryland region with extensive cropping and livestock herding, relatively close to Togo and Burkina Faso. The university has built industrial partnerships with the Ministry of Agriculture, the Savanah Agriculture Research Institute (SARI), and the Skills Development Fund (SDF) to improve agriculture in the savannah region of Ghana. Master's degrees in Ecological Agriculture and Agricultural Engineering are planned.

Collaborations 
The Bolgatanga Technical University has associations with other schools and institutions. These include the University of Ouagadougou in Burkina Faso, closer than Ghana's capital Accra, for English Language immersion training for francophone students, and industrial placements.

The University of Maryland, Eastern Shore, USA collaborates on curriculum assessment and international best practice and standards for the hospitality and tourism curricula. There is some  exchange of students and staff for research and training.

Another association is with the Apidon Academy of Science, Burkina Faso. AAS specialises in management studies and statistical training in sociology.

Health 
The university created a COVID-19 taskforce to make sure there was adherence to the safety protocols. This was to curb corona virus on campus as students get ready for the next academic year.

References

Upper East Region
Technical universities and colleges
Universities in Ghana